King's Highway 69, commonly referred to as Highway 69, is a provincially maintained north–south highway in the central portion of the Canadian province of Ontario. In conjunction with Highway 400, it links Toronto with the city of Greater Sudbury at Highway 17, via Parry Sound. It is part of the Trans-Canada Highway and the National Highway System. From its southern terminus of Highway 559 at Carling, Highway69 begins as Highway400 narrows from a four-laned freeway to a two lane highway. The final  of the route, connecting to Highway17, is a five lane arterial road that will be converted to freeway as the final phase of the four-laning.

Highway69 was first designated in 1936 when the Department of Highways (DHO) assumed the Rama Road between Atherley and Washago. This short route was extended the following year when the DHO merged with the Department of Northern Development and expanded the King's Highway network north of the Severn River. By the beginning of World War II, the route reached as far north as Britt; a separate segment connected the town of Burwash with Sudbury. However, the rationing of labour and materials due to the war effort resulted in these two sections remaining separated until the mid-1950s. In 1976, several reroutings and renumbering took place in the Muskoka area. As a result, the portion of Highway69 between Brechin and Foot's Bay was renumbered as Highway 169, while the entirety of Highway 103 between Coldwater and Foot's Bay was renumbered as Highway69.

Between 1956 and 1979, Highway69 extended through and north of Sudbury. Until some point between 1974 and 1977, it reached as far north as Capreol, after which it was truncated at Hanmer. By 1980, the northern terminus had shifted to the Southwest Bypass, onto which Highway17 was rerouted in 1995. Throughout the 1990s and 2000s, Highway400 was gradually pushed north to its current terminus by twinning Highway69, gradually truncating its length. A commitment to complete four-laning to Sudbury has been made by all three major provincial political parties in Ontario since 1991, but as of 2022 there remains  of two lane highway still to be constructed. Various former alignments of Highway69 remain in use as directional carriageways of Highway400 or as local roads. The highway forms part of the Georgian Bay Route of the Trans-Canada Highway, which continues south along Highway400.

Route description 

Highway69 is a major highway serving the recreational areas surrounding Georgian Bay and the Thirty Thousand Islands, as well as providing the westernmost fixed connection between southern and northern Ontario; the highway occupies the northern portion of a corridor that connects Toronto to Sudbury, with Highway400 occupying the southern portion. While Highway 6 is located further west, it requires the use of a ferry service between the Bruce Peninsula and Manitoulin Island.

Between Nobel and Sudbury, there are no large communities, although numerous small communities lie adjacent to the route, including the Shawanaga First Nation, Pointe au Baril, Magnetawan First Nation, Byng Inlet, Britt, Bigwood, Delamere and the Henvey Inlet First Nation.

Highway69 travels in a predominantly north-northeast direction, well inland of Georgian Bay. The Canadian Shield dominates the topography, resulting in numerous transverse marshes and rock outcroppings that bisect the highway, with dense forests in between;
services are limited and distant. Exiting Carling Township, the highway enters The Archipelago, where it scrapes the northeastern edge of the Shawanaga First Nation. It provides access to Pointe au Baril and Pointe au Baril Station before intersecting the southern end of Highway529, a former alignment of the highway.
It enters Unorganized Centre Parry Sound District, a sparsely-inhabited agglomeration of townships, where it provides access to Britt and Britt Station, as well as the northern end of Highway529.

Progressing north, Highway69 enters Sudbury District at the community of Key River. It passes through Cranberry, intersecting Highway 522. Highway69 widens to a four lane freeway north of Highway522 before briefly curving northward. It crosses the French River near Wanikewin and encounters an interchange with Highway607 near Bigwood. It remains a divided four-laned freeway the remainder of its journey into Sudbury, passing by the communities of Rutter, Burwash, Estaire, and Wanup before merging into a four-lane arterial road immediately southeast of Highway17 at the Southeast Bypass. The highway ends at the interchange with Highway 17; past this point, the roadway continues into Sudbury as Municipal Road 46 (Regent Street).

History 

In other places, a minor two-lane gravel highway has gradually been upgraded to a four-lane freeway. On August5, 1936, the DHO assumed the Rama Road, connecting Highway 12 at Atherley with Highway 11 at Washago.
On March31, 1937, the Department of Northern Development (DND) was merged into the DHO, allowing the latter to extend the provincial highway network north of the Severn River.
This extension followed DND trunk routes to Nobel, where a munitions and aircraft factory would soon provide an instrumental role in the war effort. In the north, the road connecting Sudbury and Burwash was also assumed as Highway69 on August11.
It was intended to connect these two segments over the next several years; however, the outbreak of World War II in September 1939 halted all non-essential construction due to the short supply of labour and materials.
Although an extension from the Naiscoot River to Britt would open by 1940.

Once the war ended, construction resumed to bridge the  gap between the two sections of Highway 69.
French River and Alban would be linked to the provincial highway network via Britt by 1952. This allowed motorists to take a far more direct route between Severn River and Sudbury, by taking advantage of a detour via Highway 535 and Highway64, through the small communities of Hagar and Noëlville.
That same year also saw the rerouting of the southern end of the highway; the southern end was moved east from Atherley to Brechin and the Rama Road decommissioned as a provincial highway. The new routing was longer but gave the southern end of the highway a more significant purpose than as a bypass of Highway11. The Rama Road has since been known as Simcoe County Road44.

The biggest gap that remained on Highway69 was between Alban and Burwash, but this was eliminated from 1952 to 1955,
providing a third link from Southern Ontario to Northern Ontario (the other two being Highway11 and Highway17). Until Highway69 was completed between Parry Sound and Sudbury, drivers travelling between Southern Ontario and Sudbury or Sault Ste. Marie had to travel along a circuitous routing via Highway11 to North Bay, and thence along Highway17 to Sudbury and beyond to Sault Ste. Marie.

The year 1976 saw big changes for Highway69. The portion of highway south of MacTier was shifted onto the routing of former Highway103, completely absorbing that roadway into its length. The former routing was renamed Highway169. It was at this time that Highway69 was at its longest, from Highway12 and Highway400 at Waubaushene north to Sudbury.
Until the mid-1970s, Highway69 continued through Sudbury along Regent Street, Paris Street and Notre Dame Avenue, and into the suburban towns of Valley East and Capreol. At some point between 1974 and 1977, it was truncated at Hanmer.
By 1980, the northern terminus had shifted to the Southwest Bypass.
While this route is no longer part of the provincial highway, and is officially designated as a series of Sudbury Municipal Roads, it is still often referred to locally as "Highway69 North".

Four-laning 

Although planning for an eventual four-lane highway started in 1969, the commitment to expand Highway69 to a full freeway was first made in 1991 by the New Democrat government of Bob Rae.
That year construction began on the southbound structures over Matchedash Bay and the Canadian National Railway crossing north of Highway12. Both were complete by the end of 1990. During 1991, construction began on the interchanges at Quarry Road and Port Severn Road, new service roads between those interchanges and the southbound structure over the Trent–Severn Waterway. This work was carried out through the 1990s as one large project, reaching as far as south of Go Home Lake Road (Muskoka District Roads32/38) by mid-to-late 1997.
It was extended  farther to south of the Musquash River in October 1999.
The Highway400 designation was moved north, and Highway69 equally shortened, after each project.

However, that project was shelved by the Progressive Conservative (PC) government of Mike Harris shortly after the 1995 provincial election.
Despite this, construction of the segment from Highway 141 to the Seguin River, proceeded in November 1999, and the MacTier bypass south of Highway141 to the Moon River in February 2000. The majority of these three projects were built on a new alignment, with the former route of Highway69 becoming Lake Joseph Road and Oastler Park Road.
Lake Joseph Road is maintained by the MTO as an unsigned highway. The portion south of Highway141 designated as Highway7289, and the northern portion as Highway7290.
The Parry Sound Bypass, from Badger Road to the Seguin River, opened on November1, 2001;
the section from Highway141 to Badger Road opened in October 2002;
and the MacTier Bypass opened on October7, 2003.

The Highway400 designation was extended northward from the Musquash River to the Seguin River following the opening of the MacTier Bypass, but the Highway69 designation remained in place as a concurrency. This was due a  two lane gap between the Musquash and Moon Rivers, passing through the Wahta Mohawks territory, that came to be known as the Wahta Gap.
The Territorial Reserve did not oppose the construction; however, the land was unobtainable due to a technicality requiring a minimum voter turnout of 65 percent.
The land claim was settled by a vote held on October25, 2003.
Following ratification, construction began in December 2004,
and opened July15, 2008.
Following its completion, Highway69 was truncated at what is now the south junction of Lake Joseph Road (Exit189) near MacTier, an overall reduction of over  since prior to 1989.

The City of Sudbury continued to lobby for the expansion of the highway, calling attention especially to an ongoing series of fatal car accidents at the intersection of Highway 637, where a sharp S-curve along Highway69 rendered the approaching intersection effectively invisible to northbound traffic. Assisted by Rick Bartolucci, the Liberal  for Sudbury, the CRASH 69 (Community Rallying Against Substandard Highway69) committee of Sudbury residents campaigned throughout the late 1990s and early 2000s to have the project reinstated.

Premier Harris' successor (and former MPP for Parry Sound—Muskoka), Ernie Eves, announced the resumption of construction between Parry Sound and Sudbury in 2002; however, the PCs did not commit to four-laning the entire route. The Liberal government of Dalton McGuinty came to power following the 2003 election with a promise to have a commitment in place within sixmonths.
Construction began on a  segment south of Sudbury to Estaire in January 2005, with route planning studies now completed for the remaining two-lane sections.
In June of that year, construction began on a  extension of four-laning from Parry Sound to north of Nobel. Later in 2005, the provincial government announced that four-laning between Parry Sound and Sudbury would be completed by 2017.

The first project completed north of Parry Sound was the section between Sudbury and Estaire, which opened on November12, 2009.
The section from south of the Seguin River in Parry Sound to north of Highway 559, bypassing Nobel, opened on October26, 2010.
The former alignment in Sudbury is now known as Estaire Road,
while the former route through Nobel is now Nobel Road.
In 2008, work began to realign the S-curve at Highway637; two lanes opened to traffic on July27, 2010,
while the completed four-lane route, with an interchange at Highway637, opened to traffic on August8, 2012.
The former alignment now has the name Murdock River Road, and serves as a local road accessible only from Highway637.

Highway69 passes through significant tracts of wilderness and forested land, and consequently has seen a rate of animal collisions well above the provincial norm. Several segments of the four-laned route will include special grade-separated wildlife crossings, the first of which was completed in March 2012.
In the summer of 2012, work began to four lane a  segment between north of Highway 64 and the Murdock River,
as well as on a  segment between Highway 607 and north of Highway64.
The first project was opened September11, 2015,
while the segment from north of Highway607 to north of Highway64, including an interchange at the latter, was opened by the beginning of August 2016.
The most recently completed section as of 2023 was a  segment from north of Highway522 to north of Highway607 that opened on December23, 2021.

Future 
Although the original plan called for the four-laning of the highway to be complete by 2017, the timeline was pushed back due to delays in environmental assessments and land negotiations with First Nations bands impacted by the construction.
In the early 2010s, a widespread perception that the project appeared to be falling behind schedule was frequently discussed in Sudbury's media and by candidates in municipal and provincial elections,
but the Ministry of Transportation continued to assert that the project was on track for completion in 2017. In March 2015, the ministry officially acknowledged that the 2017 timeline would not be met, and indicated that the new target date was between 2019 and 2021. In 2017, however, although the ministry made no formal announcement, its annual Northern Highways Report listed a completion date within that period only for the section already under construction between the French River and north of Highway 522 at Grundy Lake Provincial Park.
This section opened in December 2021, several months ahead of the originally foreseen completion date of 2022. 

The remaining route between Nobel and Grundy Lake is listed as "beyond 2021", as of July 2021.
A  section, from north of the Magnetawan River to Grundy Lake, is funded but has no announced construction timeline.

Major intersections

References

External links 

Highway 69 at OntHighways.com
Highway 69 Four-Laning Detail Design
Highway 69 Expansion - engineering and design projects

069
Ontario 069
Transport in the District Municipality of Muskoka
Roads in Greater Sudbury
Transport in Parry Sound District
Transport in Parry Sound, Ontario